Mathias Westerblom (also Mathias Vesterblom; 15 September 1888 Noarootsi Parish (now Lääne-Nigula Parish), Wiek County – 5 February 1942 Ussolye prison camp, Perm Oblast) was an Estonian politician. He was a member of IV Riigikogu. He was a member of the Riigikogu since 31 January 1930. He replaced Wilhelm von Wrangell.

References

1888 births
1942 deaths
People from Lääne-Nigula Parish
People from Kreis Wiek
Swedish People's League in the Baltic Sea Provinces politicians
Members of the Riigikogu, 1929–1932
Members of the Riigikogu, 1932–1934
Estonian people who died in Soviet detention
Estonian people of Swedish descent